Coughtrie is a surname. Notable people with the surname include:

 Richard Coughtrie (born 1988), English-born Scottish cricketer
 Stan Coughtrie, Scottish rugby union footballer
 Thomas Coughtrie (1917–2008), Scottish engineer and inventor

See also
 Coughtry